Cerekvice nad Bystřicí is a municipality and village in Jičín District in the Hradec Králové Region of the Czech Republic. It has about 800 inhabitants.

Administrative parts
Villages of Čenice 2.díl and Třebovětice are administrative parts of Cerekvice nad Bystřicí.

References

Villages in Jičín District